The mediatised houses (or mediatized houses) were ruling princely and comital-ranked houses that were mediatised in the Holy Roman Empire during the period 1803–1815 as part of German mediatisation, and were later recognised in 1825–1829 by the German ruling houses as possessing considerable rights and rank. With few exceptions, these houses were those whose heads held a seat in the Imperial Diet when mediatised during the establishment of the Confederation of the Rhine in 1806–07, by France in 1810, or by the Congress of Vienna in 1814–15. The mediatised houses were organised into two ranks: the princely houses, entitled to the predicate Durchlaucht (Serene Highness), which previously possessed a vote on the Bench of Princes  (Furstenbank); and the comital houses that were accorded the address of Erlaucht (Illustrious Highness), which previously possessed a vote in one of the four Benches of Counts (Gräfenbank). Although some form of mediatisation occurred in other countries, such as France, Italy and Russia, only designated houses within the former Holy Roman Empire legally comprised the mediatised houses.

Privileges
Mediatised houses generally possessed greater rights than other German noble families. Whilst they lost sovereignty and certain rights (such as legislation, taxation, appellate jurisdiction, and control over policing and conscription) in their territories, they often still retained their private estates and some feudal rights, which may have included exclusive or primary access to local forestry, fishing, mining or hunting resources, jurisdiction over policing and lower level civil and criminal court cases. Mediatised houses also possessed the right to settle anywhere within the German Confederation while retaining their territorial prerogatives. The Congress of Vienna specified that the mediatised houses were recognised as the first vassals in their respective states, were usually entitled to membership in the legislative upper chambers in which their lands lay (such as the Austrian or Prussian House of Lords), and held rank equivalent to ruling houses. However the Congress of Vienna did not specify which families were considered mediatised.

Members of mediatised houses possessed a rank higher than other German ducal, princely and comital families which held the same or even a higher hereditary title. For example, a prince (Fürst) of a mediatised house ranked higher than a duke (Herzog) of a family that had never possessed Imperial immediacy, even though in Germany, nominally, a duke is of higher rank than a prince.

Equality of birth
Most importantly, members of the mediatised houses were recognized as entitled to retain the equality of birth their families had enjoyed under the Holy Roman Empire with Germany's reigning dynasties, who inter-married by right with the other ruling houses of Europe. Although this privilege did not automatically require that every ruling family had to accept all members of mediatised families as eligible for dynastic inter-marriage (see Countess Auguste von Harrach), each mediatised family was allowed to impose its own marital standards by house law, and could be accepted by ruling families without legal demur. This had practical effects in determining whether a marriage was considered morganatic or not, and what rights the children of such a marriage might possess.

It was ultimately left up to each of the sovereign states to determine which families were counted as part of the mediatised houses and which were not, leading to discrepancies between the roster of the Imperial Diet in 1806 and the families counted amongst the mediatised. Prior to 1806, the term "exemption" was used to refer to states which surrendered their immediacy and high jurisdiction rights to another state but retained their votes in the Imperial Diet. Not all exempt houses were counted amongst the mediatised houses. Further discrepancies exist because the houses were mediatised between 1806–1814 and the rosters of the princely and comital mediatised houses were not drawn up until 1825 and 1829 respectively, during which period some families had become extinct or sold those of their territories to which the rights of mediatisation appertained.

From 1836 the Almanach de Gotha listed the mediatised houses in a section of their own, separate from both ruling dynasties and from princely and ducal families which were not recognized as having exercised sovereignty since the Congress of Vienna.

The rights of the mediatised houses in Austria and Czechoslovakia were abolished in 1919 following the defeat of Austria-Hungary in World War I and the establishment of republics in those countries. Rights were also abolished in Germany in 1919, however the abolition was not initially enforced.

The following lists are exhaustive, including all of the mediatised houses.

List of Princely mediatised houses (Durchlaucht)

List of Comital mediatised houses (Erlaucht)

List of Houses not considered as part of the mediatised houses
Listed below are houses that for one reason or another were not counted amongst the mediatised houses. Usually this is because they became extinct before the formalisation of the mediatised houses in 1825/9, they divested their immediate territories just prior to the German mediatisation in 1806, or they surrendered their mediate rights before 1825/9. The formal list of the mediatised Houses generally doesn't include the families bearers of old Imperial States outside the German Confederation (France, Italy, Belgium, Netherlands).

References and notes

Political history of Germany